USS Joy (SP-643) was a United States Navy patrol vessel in commission from 1917 to 1918.

Joy was built as a private motor yacht of the same name by B. F. Wood at City Island in the Bronx, New York, in 1905. In June 1917, the U.S. Navy acquired her from her owners, T. M. Jones and P. C. Kauffman of Newport, Rhode Island, for use as a section patrol boat during World War I. She was commissioned as USS Joy (SP-643) in 1917.

Assigned to the 2nd Naval District in southern New England, Joy performed patrol duty until declared unfit for service sometime in 1918.

Joy was returned to Jones and Kauffman on 6 May 1919.

References

Department of the Navy Naval History and Heritage Command Online Library of Selected Images: U.S. Navy Ships -- Listed by Hull Number: SP-643 Joy at "SP" #s and "ID" #s -- World War I Era Patrol Vessels and other Acquired Ships and Craft numbered from SP-600 through SP-699
NavSource Online: Section Patrol Craft Photo Archive Joy (SP 643)

Patrol vessels of the United States Navy
World War I patrol vessels of the United States
Ships built in City Island, Bronx
1905 ships
Individual yachts